Senator Ellis may refer to:

Affie Ellis, Wyoming State Senate
Arthur Ellis (Maryland politician) (born 1961), Maryland State Senate
Bertram Ellis (1860–1920), New Hampshire State Senate
Edward D. Ellis (1801–1848), Michigan State Senate
Frank Burton Ellis (1907–1969), Louisiana State Senate
Frederick S. Ellis (1830–1880), Wisconsin State Senate
Jerry Ellis (Oklahoma politician) (born 1946), Oklahoma State Senate
Johnny Ellis (born 1960), Alaska State Senate
Mary Gordon Ellis (1889–1934), South Carolina State Senate
Michael Ellis (American politician) (1941–2018), Wisconsin State Senate
Powhatan Ellis (1790–1863), U.S. Senator from Mississippi
Rodney Ellis (born 1954), Texas State Senate
William A. Ellis (1828–1900), Wisconsin State Senate